HMS Lynx (F27), was a Leopard-class Type 41 anti aircraft frigate of the British Royal Navy, named after the lynx.

She was laid down by John Brown and Company, Clydebank, Scotland, on 13 August 1953, launched on 12 January 1955, and commissioned on 14 March 1957. On 12 March 1982 she was sold to the Bangladesh Navy and renamed BNS Abu Bakr. She was decommissioned and scrapped in 2014.

Construction and design
The Leopard-class, or Type 41, frigates were designed for a main role of providing anti-aircraft protection for convoys. As such they were provided with a heavy gun armament but did not require high speed.

Four more of these engines were used to generate electricity, driving 500 kW alternators.

The ship's main gun armament consisted of two twin 4.5 inch (113 mm) Mark 6 dual purpose gun turrets, mounted one forward and one aft, with a STAAG twin stabilised 40mm Bofors mount providing close-in anti-aircraft defence, although this mounting was unreliable and later replaced by a single Bofors gun. A single Squid anti submarine mortar was fitted. As built, Leopard was fitted with a Type 960 long-range radar on the ship's mainmast and Type 293Q surface/air search radar on the foremast. A Mark 6M fire control system (including a Type 275 radar) for the 4.5 inch guns was mounted above the ship's bridge, with a secondary CRBF (Close-Range Blind Fire) director aft, fitted with Type 262 Radar, while the STAAG mount was fitted with its own Type 262 fire control radar. while a Type 974 navigation radar was also fitted. Type 965 long-range air search radar replaced Type 960 during a refit in 1964 and 1966, with Type 993 surface/air search and target indication radar replaced the Type 293Q. The ship's sonar fit consisted of Type 174 search, Type 170 fire control sonar for Squid and a Type 162 sonar for classifying targets on the sea floor.

Lynx was laid down at John Brown and Company's Clydebank shipyard on 13 August 1953, was launched on 12 January 1955 by Mary, Princess Royal and commissioned on 14 March 1957, as the first of her class.

Royal Navy service
On commissioning Lynx served as the leader of the 7th Frigate Squadron, with the squadron alternating between service in home waters and in at the South Atlantic Station. On 3 May 1960, Lynx, carrying out trials off Portsmouth, was diverted to search for survivors after a small fishing boat was sunk in a collision with the German tanker Caperata. In September 1964, with tensions heightening between Britain and Argentina over the Falkland Islands sovereignty dispute, an Argentine light aircraft landed on Port Stanley racecourse, and its pilot, Miguel Fitzgerald, planted an Argentine flag and handed a written proclamation of Argentine sovereignty to an islander before flying back to Argentina. In response, Lynx, forming part of a task group off the coast of South America, was ordered to the Falklands, remaining there from 14 October to 11 November.

In March 1967, following the disbanding of the South Atlantic station, Lynx was the last Royal Navy ship based at the Simonstown naval base in South Africa, then transferring to the Far East. On 30 December 1972, the Japanese cargo ship Kyoryu Maru, carrying a cargo of timber from Selat Panjang to Singapore, sank after a collision with the Japanese tanker Shoen Maru,  from Singapore. Lynx, on patrol off Singapore, took part in the search for nine missing crewmembers from Kyoryu Maru. Lynx was paid off in June 1974, and after a refit at Rosyth, joined the Standby Squadron at Chatham. She attended the 1977 Silver Jubilee Fleet Review off Spithead.

Bangladeshi Navy service

She was transferred to the Bangladeshi Navy 12 March 1982 and renamed BNS Abu Bakr. She was assigned to the Commodore Commanding BN Flotilla (COMBAN). About 200 personnel served aboard Abu Bakr, with most living aboard her.

In November 2008, BNS Abu Bakr  along with BNS Nirbhoy and BNS Madhumati intercepted Myanmar Navy ships at a disputed region of Bay of Bengal where they were supporting an exploration of oil and gas fields.

She was decommissioned during a ceremony held in her homeport Chittagong on 22 January 2014. She was replaced by a Chinese Type 053H2 frigate with the same name and pennant number.

See also
List of historic ships of the Bangladesh Navy

References

Publications

 
 

 
 
 

Ships built on the River Clyde
Leopard-class frigates
1955 ships